was a 9th century Japanese ambassador to Tang dynasty China. He was the son of Fujiwara no Oguromaro.

Mission to China

In 803, the Emperor Kanmu ordered an expedition to China, led by Kadanomaro. During the Heian period, emperors usually sent envoys to China soon after their accession; this had been delayed in Kanmu's case because of the relocation of the capital. The mission left in May, but severe storms damaged the ships and forced a return to Japan, after spending some time in Dazaifu, Fukuoka. In June the next year, the mission, consisting of four ships, was sent out again.

Kadanomaro with three vice-secretaries (Ishikawa Michimasa, Tachibana Hayanari, and the young Kukai) travelled on one vessel; Saicho, Yoshitada (Saicho's translator), and Sugawara no Kiyotomo were on another. The expedition was split up en route, with Kadanomaro's ship arriving in Fujian after thirty-four days, rather than the intended Yangtze River Delta. The local people were initially opposed to allowing the mission to make landfall, as they did not understand the purpose of the expedition. After Kūkai presented them with a document, written in Chinese, detailing the nature of the mission, the Japanese were allowed ashore. They were subsequently escorted to Chang'an.

They arrived at the court in early 805, but Emperor Dezong of Tang, the ruler, died shortly afterwards. The mission then returned to Japan via Tsushima Island. Kadanomaro then submitted a report on the uprisings and internal instability in China to Kanmu.

Bibliography

References

See also
 Japanese missions to Tang China

Year of birth missing
Japanese ambassadors to the Tang dynasty
9th-century Japanese people